Gerhard Riedmann (1925–2004) was an Austrian film actor. He was married to the actress Eva Probst.

Partial filmography

 Das andere Leben (1948) - (uncredited)
 Child of the Danube (1950) - Bit Part (uncredited)
  (1951) - Max' Freund (uncredited)
 Verlorene Melodie (1952)
 1. April 2000 (1952) - Reitender Bote (uncredited)
 Abenteuer im Schloss (1952) - Georg
 Flucht ins Schilf (1953) - Gerhard Altdorfer, Postbote
  (1953) - Kurt Amreiner
 The Bird Seller (1953) - Adam, Vogelhändler
 The Cousin from Nowhere (1953) - Hans, ein Wanderbursche
 The Gypsy Baron (1954) - Sandor, sein Sohn
 The Beautiful Miller (1954) - Fritz Mertens
  (1954) - Christian
 Espionage (1955) - Hauptmann Angelis
 Sergeant Borck (1955) - Oberwachtmeister Borck
 The Happy Village (1955) - Walter Meiners, Lehrer
 Yes, Yes, Love in Tyrol (1955) - Peter Lenz
 Love Is Just a Fairytale (1955) - Dr. Klaus Weinert
 Your Life Guards (1955) - Alexander
 Magic Fire (1956) - King Ludwig II
 Die Fischerin vom Bodensee (1956) - Hans Bruckberger
 As Long as the Roses Bloom (1956) - Michael
 The Beggar Student (1956) - Symon Rymanowicz
 Jede Nacht in einem anderen Bett (1957) - Borro Müller
 And Lead Us Not Into Temptation (1957) - Stefan von Ausberg
 Die Prinzessin von St. Wolfgang (1957) - Toni Leitner
 Hoch droben auf dem Berg (1957) - Toni Hofer
 Spring in Berlin (1957) - Ferry Meister
 The Saint and Her Fool (1957) - Harro
 ...und führe uns nicht in Versuchung (1957) - Hudetz
 The Count of Luxemburg (1957) - René, Graf von Luxemburg
  (1958) -  Robert Mertens
 Solang' die Sterne glüh'n (1958) - Conny Meister, Reporter
  (1958) - Erzherzog Peter Ferdinand
 The Csardas King (1958) - Emmerich Kalman / Imre Kalman
 Arena of Fear (1959) - Ruda, Raubtierdompteur
 My Daughter Patricia (1959) - Lüthi
 Liebe, Luft und lauter Lügen (1959) - Peter Brinckmann
 Bei der blonden Kathrein (1959) - Clemens Hagen
 I'm Marrying the Director (1960) - Franz Bogner
 What Is Father Doing in Italy? (1961) - Amilare Barnabas
 Das ist die Liebe der Matrosen (1962) - Fritz Schönthal
 Waldrausch (1962) - Ambros Lutz
 Call of the Forest (1965) - Mathias
 The Pipes (1966) - Kurt
 Clint the Stranger (1967) - Bill O'Brien
 Madame Bovary (1969) - Dr. Charles Bovary
 Hubertus Castle (1973) - Lenz Bruckner
 Zwei himmlische Dickschädel (1974) - Lechner
 Waldrausch (1977) - Wohlverstand

References

External links
 

1925 births
2004 deaths
Austrian male film actors
Austrian male television actors
20th-century Austrian male actors
Male actors from Vienna